The men's javelin throw event at the 1985 Summer Universiade was held at the Kobe Universiade Memorial Stadium in Kobe on 1 and 2 September 1985. It was the last time the old model javelin was used by men at the Games.

Medalists

Results

Qualification

Final

References

Athletics at the 1985 Summer Universiade
1985